There are 42 Lok Sabha Constituencies in West Bengal, India. Here is the list of candidates of all the major parties.

List of major parties' candidates in West Bengal for 2014

Results

Results by constituency

Analysis 
According to DNA newspaper's analysis: "BJP emerged as a potential force in West Bengal where it is traditionally considered weak.". While BJP won only 2 seats, BJP candidates for the first time, returned runner-up in 3 seats and it also got 16.8% vote share - BJP's best performance so far surpassing its previous best of 11.66% in 1991 elections. However. Trinamool Congress dominated the election winning 34 seats. The CPI-M led Left Front was decimated winning only 2 seats as the BJP made inroads in its vote share. It was also argued that, ""resurgence of the Left can never be ruled out"

Assembly segments wise lead of Parties

Postal Ballot wise lead of Parties

References

West
Indian general elections in West Bengal
2010s in West Bengal